Lori Cotler, known artistically as Loire, is an American rhythm vocalist, composer, recording artist, educator, and music therapist known for her Konnakol, scat singing, world music vocal stylings, ethno jazz interpretations, and film score vocals.

Early life 

Cotler was born in New York City and raised in Roslyn Estates, New York. She began studying piano at age six and was writing instrumental by age ten. At age eleven, she was inspired to become a vocalist after a chance encounter with Cuban percussionist Cándido Camero at her brother's bar mitzvah. Loire sang and played keyboard in rock bands throughout her teenage years. Her band Kizmit featured her original music, although plans to record a studio album were shelved when she decided to pursue a career in scat singing.

In 2013, on the advice of her manager, she adopted her nickname, Loire, as a stage name.

Voice and style 

Loire has been described  as a "rhythm vocalist." Her singing incorporates hybrid vocal techniques, including vocal percussion and wordless melodic improvisations inspired by Jewish niggun, Middle Eastern taksim, Central Asian khöömei, scat singing, and South Indian Konnakol.

Film score vocal work 
Loire's passion for cinema and film music as a child propelled her to sneak into the open doors of a local indie theater after being lured inside by the sound of Vangelis’ Chariots of Fire main theme. When it came time to declare a major at Berklee College of Music, Loire had already filled out an application to become a film scoring major, but she kept delaying to turn it in. Listening to scores by Max Steiner, Ennio Morricone, James Newton Howard, and Hans Zimmer on a loop and wrestling with which road to take, she happened to come across a cassette of classical Indian percussion music with a drum language solo.  It was in that moment that she chose to stay on her own path to becoming a rhythm vocalist.

In December 2017 her dream of collaborating with film composers came full circle after being introduced to Academy Award-winning composer Hans Zimmer by renowned vocalist and vocal contractor Edie Lehmann Boddicker and legendary synthesist Michael Lehmann Boddicker.

Loire's collaboration with Zimmer and his Remote Control Productions team, including composers, Steve Mazzaro, David Fleming and Andy Page, led to her vocal work on X-Men Dark Phoenix (Original Motion Picture Soundtrack), Xperiments from Dark Phoenix (soundtrack album) and Denis Villeneuve's  Dune (2021). In 2020 Zimmer introduced Loire's work to his longtime collaborator and friend Grammy winning and multiple Oscar nominated film composer James Newton Howard. Soon after Loire began working remotely with James as the vocal soloist on his score for the breakthrough Disney film Raya and The Last Dragon.

Collaborations and performances 
Since 2004, Loire has toured with her core duo project with Glen Velez, and has also been a featured soloist in numerous performances ranging from full orchestras to small ensembles, including the Taipei Chinese Orchestra, National Chinese Orchestra, American Composers Orchestra, Parco della Musica Contemporanea Ensemble, Nederlandse Reisopera, La Notte della Taranta Popular Orchestra, Fulcrum Point New Music Project, Nederlands Blazers Ensemble, Long Beach Opera, Ensemble Fisfüz. She has performed in venues including Carnegie Hall's Zankel Hall, The Tonhalle,  The Music Academy (Chennai), Auditorium Parco della Musica, Muziekgebouw, Slovak Radio Theater, The Met Museum, and Paradiso (Amsterdam). She has performed at numerous live music festivals, most notably: Ravenna Festival and Tamburi Mundi (Freiburg). In 2014 Loire performed for a live audience of 150,000 at La Notte Della Taranta, her largest audience to date.

In May 2019 Loire was invited by the US Embassy to perform music from her album 18 Wings (Daftof) following the idea by then incumbent US Ambassador to Slovakia Adam Sterling. Loire was joined by Glen Velez and cellist Jozef Luptak in a private concert event that took place at the Residence of the Ambassador in Bratislava and featured Loire and Glen's exhilarating rhythmic reimagining of The Great American Songbook. Since 2012, Loire has been the featured soloist in The News: a reality opera by the Dutch avant-pop composer JacobTV and she is credited for composing vocal parts for the arias Bounce or Decline and Lamento.

Loire maintains an active touring schedule in her duo with Glen Velez and is also a core member of Glen's Handance Ensemble with Shane Shanahan and Yousif Sheronick. She has shared the stage with world class musicians Lew Soloff, Howard Levy, Avi Avital, Chitravina Ravikiran, Eugene Friesen, Sonny Fortune, Jozef Luptak, Milica Paranosic, Kepa Junkera, Javier Paxariño, Murat Coşkun and Enzo Rao. She has performed and recorded works by award-winning composers Edward Bilous and Robert Miller and her signature sound can be heard on music recordings, TV commercials, dance scores and feature length documentaries and blockbuster film scores.

Loire's live performances have included radio and television broadcasts on Spanish National Radio 4, German Public Radio, Italian National Radio 3, Radio Freistadt (Austria), DRS (Swiss-German national radio), WNYC, National Public Radio, KPFK Los Angeles, KITV Hawaii, PBS, Rai Italia TV, Taipei National Television, and CBS 2.

Loire's debut album 18 Wings (Daftof) was released digitally during the COVID-19 pandemic as a tribute to the 30th anniversary of her father's death. 18 Wings features multiple Grammy artists of TRIO GLOBO - Howard Levy, Eugene Friesen and Glen Velez and highlights original music co-composed and arranged with Glen Velez, as well as their global rhythmic twist on The Great American Songbook.

Education 
Loire attended Long Island High School for the Arts, a gifted magnet school for the performing arts.  She was chosen as honorary speaker and performer at the graduation ceremony. She went on to earn a Bachelor's degree of Music from Berklee College of Music in Boston, followed by a Master's Degree in Music Therapy from New York University. During her teens, Loire's jazz mentor Dave Burns introduced her to scat singing. He recognized that Loire had an unusual aptitude for the vocal reproduction of complex and up-tempo instrumental material. Loire cites her mentor and husband Glen Velez and his Handance Method as having the greatest influence on her approach to music. She began learning Konnakol from Velez when their musical collaboration began in 2002. She also studied with Konnakol master Ghatam Subash Chandran and briefly with Vinod (VR) Venkataram. Other influential teachers include piano and harpsichord virtuoso Barbara Kupferberg and jazz vocalists Bob Stoloff, the late Mili Bermajo, and Dominique Eade. Loire has been invited to present masterclasses and workshops at The Juilliard School and other prestigious conservatories and universities around the World.[3

Personal life 
Loire has been openly bisexual since high school. She was in a long term relationship with a woman who had a great influence on her quitting her full time day job, telling her it was time to bring her music and voice to the world. Loire put in her notice on the spot.  Loire's awareness of the healing power of music began early in her life. She frequently turned to songwriting and improvisation as a way of coping with the tragic death of her close friend who was killed while riding his bicycle at age 15.  A few days after Loire's 18th birthday, tragedy struck again when her father died on February 18, 1990, at age 45. Loire's debut solo recording 18 Wings (Daftof Records) was released in 2020 as a homage to her beloved father.  The album features multiple Grammy artists, including Howard Levy, Eugene Friesen and Glen Velez. It highlights original music co-composed and arranged with Glen Velez, along with her rhythm jazz reimagining of The Great American Songbook. In the liner notes, she says “Rhythm and voice are my own wings - they are how I travel to syllables beyond thought, a subconscious language.”

Music Therapy 
Loire was a Professor of Music Therapy at The New School (2001–2007) and worked extensively in clinics, hospitals, including locked psychiatric units around New York City. She has worked with such populations as adult psychiatry, foster children/at-risk teens, autism and brain injuries. Loire continues to lend her talents to supporting Music Therapy charities and has been actively collaborating with Sounding Joy Music Therapy in Hawaii and Japan.  Loire's work in the mental health field greatly impacted her approach to music. Her clinical work inspired her to see rhythm and music in more descriptive ways, such as “what is the rhythm of anxiety,” or “what are the colors of depression”.

Discography

Studio recordings 
 2020 - 18 Wings (Daftof Records)
2020 - Echos (Sívac Records)
 2016 - Instants of Time by Enrique Haneine
2013 - (single release) Cucurrucucú Paloma
 2010 - "Herria" (Elkar/Warner Bros.) Kepa Junkera; Lori Cotler featured on "Markesaran Alaba"
 2009  - "Breathing Rhythms Duo" (Daftof Records); Glen Velez and Lori Cotler
 2008 - "Rhythms of the Chakras Vol. 2" Glen Velez (SoundsTrue)
 2006 -  "Hiri" (Elkar) Kepa Junkera; Lori Cotler featured on "Tatihou"
 2005  - "Rhythms of Awakening" Glen Velez (SoundsTrue)
 2003 -  "Elephant Hotel"(hyperlink: http://glenvelez.com/shop/music/) (Daftof Records); Glen Velez and Lori Cotler
 2003 - AfroMantra "Alignment" (Mambo Maniacs Record) Lori Cotler is featured on "Transparencias" (composer, Alex Garcia)
 1991 - Kizmit - (Unreleased EP) Original songs composed by Loire Cotler in High School.

Dance scores 
 2012–present: "Whirlwind" (Glen Velez) performances with Nai-Ni Chen Dance
 2009–present: "Mirage" performances with Nai-Ni Chen Dance 
 2007–present: "Trilogy" (Glen Velez) performances with Bridgman/Packer Dance 
 2003-2011: Mimi Garrard VideoDances - featured vocalist on dance scores by Glen Velez. 
 2004: Rain (Glen Velez) performances with Buglisi Dance Theater

Commercials 
 2015 - Raw Spirit Fragrances
 2009 - Tiffany & CO
 2005 - Frangelico USA Rope TV Advert
 2004 - CVS Extra Care (Robert Miller, RMI)

Film work 
2021 - Dune: Part One film score and soundtrack by Hans Zimmer
2020 - Raya and the Last Dragon film score and soundtrack by James Newton Howard
2020 - Hillbilly Elegy film score and soundtrack by Hans Zimmer & David Fleming
2019 - Coup 53 by Robert Miller 
2019 - Xperiments from Dark Phoenix by Hans Zimmer
2019 - X-Men Dark Phoenix (Original Motion Picture Soundtrack) by Hans Zimmer
2009 - Documentary "Renewing Creativity: Renewing American Culture - The Pursuit of Happiness"
2005 - Why We Fight  (Film by Eugene Jarecki; Composer, Robert Miller)
2001 - In an Instant (Film by Bruce Ashley; Music by Lori Cotler, Nik Leman)

External links 
 http://www.loirecotler.com 
 Article title
 https://www.boomboxshop.net/the-news.html
 http://www.hans-zimmer.com/index.php?rub=disco&id=
 http://edwardbilous.com/portfolio/night-of-the-dark-moon-opening/
 https://www.screensoundalliance.com/about (Composer Robert Miller) 
 http://www.subashchandranmusic.com
 http://www.kepajunkera.com
 http://www.levyland.com
 http://www.celloman.com
 http://www.lewsoloff.com

References 

Living people
Year of birth missing (living people)